Nucleoside oxidase is an enzyme with systematic name nucleoside:oxygen 5'-oxidoreductase. This enzyme catalyses the following chemical reaction

 inosine + O2  9-riburonosylhypoxanthine + H2O
 (1a) 2 inosine + O2  2 5'-dehydroinosine + 2 H2O
 (1b) 2 5'-dehydroinosine + O2  2 9-riburonosylhypoxanthine

This enzyme could use other purine and pyrimidine nucleosides (as well as 2'-deoxynucleosides) as substrates.

References

External links 
 

EC 1.1.3